Tuscarora Creek Historic District is a national historic district located near Martinsburg and Nollville, Berkeley County, West Virginia. It encompasses 31 contributing buildings and three contributing sites, related to the early settlement and economic development along the Tuscarora Creek.  Notable buildings in the district include: Patterson's Mill (1765) and the miller's house, "Elm Dale," the Silber-Walters House, Huxley Hall, site of Patterson's New Mill and miller's house, Hibbard Mill, Tuscarora School, Providence Cemetery, the Mong House, Tuscarora Church (1802), James Noll Shop, Rumsey Mill site, and the poor house or "Mansion House" (1788).

It was listed on the National Register of Historic Places in 1980.

References

Historic districts in Berkeley County, West Virginia
Federal architecture in West Virginia
Georgian architecture in West Virginia
Italianate architecture in West Virginia
Houses on the National Register of Historic Places in West Virginia
Houses in Berkeley County, West Virginia
Historic districts on the National Register of Historic Places in West Virginia
National Register of Historic Places in Berkeley County, West Virginia